Defence Colony is a neighbourhood in Delhi. It was built in the 1960s for veterans of the Indian Armed Forces. It serves as the administrative headquarters of the South East Delhi district of Delhi.

It is popular for being centrally located to all major parts of the city, its well-maintained parks, broad streets, active community clubs, and notable residents from entertainment and politics. Defence Colony is home to many restaurants, coffee shops, art galleries and, shops.

Overview
Defence Colony was created in the aftermath of the partition in 1947. Newly independent India allotted land to resettle serving Indian military officers whose homes lay across the new border in Muslim-majority Pakistan. Besides its central location from most parts of the city of Delhi, the locality is immensely popular among all Delhiites for the exotic varieties of cuisines that it has on offer . There are many restaurants in Defence Colony.

Defence Colony Welfare Association Club, commonly referred to as Defence Colony Club was established in 1976 as Defence Colony Ex. Services Institute, however, was renamed in 1980 and functions under the Defence Colony Welfare Association.

Historic monuments
Close to the main Defence Colony market inside a roundabout stands the octagonal tomb of Shaikh Ali, known as "Gumti of Shaikh Ali". Built-in the 15th-century Lodhi dynasty-era, near the historic area of Kotla Mubarakpur, it housed two graves inside the tomb until the early 20th-century, which are now long gone. The tomb has housed the Defence Colony Welfare Association (DCWA) office since 1960.

Transportation
Defence Colony is accessible by many means of public transport including auto rickshaw, taxi, Delhi Transport Corporation buses as well as the Delhi Metro. The closest metro station to most of Defence Colony is Lajpat Nagar, which is an interchange station between the Violet Line and Pink Line. For some parts of the Defence Colony, it is closer to walk to the South Extension metro station, which is on the Pink Line. To the Northeast of Defence Colony is the Sewa Nagar railway station of the Delhi Ring Railway.

To the South, Defence Colony is bounded by the Ring Road. To its east and west are Lala Lajpat Rai Marg and Bhishma Pitamah Marg respectively. The North of Defence Colony is bounded by the tracks of the Delhi Ring Railway.

Establishments 
 Sagar Ratna, s south Indian food chain, 90 restaurants, opened its first restaurant here in 1986
 Defence Bakery opened in 1962, is known for its breads and pastries
 Vadehra Art Gallery, upscale art gallery
 4S, Dive Bar, serving Thai and Chinese
 Nehru Homeopathic Medical College and Hospital
 Gulshan Estate Agents Pvt Ltd, established in 1959, have been the Realtors of this colony for a long time and have facilitated the residents for renting out and redevelopment of the houses.

Residents 
 Vishal Uppal, Indian national tennis player
 Rohit Bal, Indian fashion designer
 Nafisa Ali, former Miss India
 Sidharth Malhotra, actor
 Dr Ashok K Chauhan, Industrialist and philanthropist

Education
South Delhi Public School, a senior secondary school affiliated with the CBSE
 Dr Radha Krishan International School in C Block.

Places of worship 

 Gurudwara Singh Sabha
 Shri Radha Krishna Mandir
 Arya Samaj
 Shiv Mandir
 Defence Colony Jama Masjid

References

External links
Defence Colony Welfare Association Club, website

Neighbourhoods in Delhi
District subdivisions of Delhi
South East Delhi district